Kelly Evernden and Johan Kriek were the defending champions but did not compete that year.

Paul Annacone and Christo van Rensburg won in the final 6–3, 7–5 against Rick Leach and Jim Pugh.

Seeds
All eight seeded teams received byes to the second round.

Draw

Finals

Top half

Bottom half

References
 1989 Ebel U.S. Pro Indoor Doubles Draw

U.S. Pro Indoor
1989 Grand Prix (tennis)